Darya Georgievna Jurgens is a Russian actress most noted for her role in the film Brother 2 as prostitute Marilyn / Dasha. Until 2003, she was known as Darya Lesnikova. She has had a long career, both in stage, television, and film.

TV series
Streets of Broken Lights
Sherlock Holmes (2013 TV series)

Films
Of Freaks and Men
Brother 2

References 

Living people
1968 births
Russian film actresses
People from Tomsk